The Treaty of Kėdainiai or Kiejdany (Lithuanian: Kėdainių sutartis; Swedish: Freden i Kėdainiai), signed on 17 August 1655, was a Swedish–Lithuanian agreement during the Second Northern War. After the Polish forces had been decisively defeated in the Battle of Ujście in which the Poznań and Kalisz palatines surrendered to Sweden, Lithuanian hetman Janusz Radziwiłł decided to discontinue the war. In Kėdainiai, he accepted Swedish protection.

The treaty specified also that the Polish–Lithuanian Commonwealth was not dissolved and that Lithuanian forces would not fight Polish forces, but the text of the treaty included protests of the lack of Polish support. On 20 October, the treaty was superseded by the Union of Kėdainiai, which united the Grand Duchy of Lithuania with the Swedish Empire.

References

Second Northern War
1655 treaties
1655 in Europe
1655 in Sweden
Lithuania–Sweden relations